Walter John Cherry ( 10 May 1932 – 7 March 1986) was an Australian academic, drama scholar and theatre director, producer and manager

Biography
Cherry was born in  Ballarat, Victoria to Victorian parents Walter Joseph Cherry, a commercial artist and Vera White. He attended St. Patricks College, Geelong and Geelong High School, before entering the University of Melbourne and obtaining a Bacholar of the Arts.

As the founder and director of the Emerald Hill Theatre Company in Melbourne, Victoria, Cherry gained a reputation in the early 1960s for innovative programming and bold productions, particularly of Australian plays. Along with George Whaley, he experimented with different acting forms and approaches to theatre. He was also a champion of Bertolt Brecht, both his plays and his contributions to theatre theory (especially the so-called "alienation effect" or Verfremdungseffekt).

When Flinders University was set up in Adelaide, South Australia in 1967, Cherry was appointed to the Foundation Chair of Drama, the first such appointment at an Australian university. In its first year, the fledgling Drama Department at Flinders had a staff of only two (Cherry and ex-ABC Radio man George Anderson), but Cherry's energy and high-profile drove significant expansion, and by the mid-1970s, the department had over a dozen staff, teaching Drama as both an academic discipline, and as training for professional careers in theatre and film, a unique approach at the time.

When Flinders established its first on-campus student accommodation, the "Hall of Residence", Cherry was appointed Dean, and lived in the Hall.

While at Flinders, Cherry continued his contribution to professional Australian theatre off-campus. He was a key member of the board of the nascent State Theatre Company of South Australia (SATC). In that position, he drove significant changes in the direction of the company, but his objective of a continuing close link between the SATC and the Flinders Drama Department was never realised. He also continued to direct for various companies, including a notable production of Jean-Paul Sartre's Kean for the SATC in 1970. On-campus, in 1971-2 he wrote and directed a play, Horrie's Alibi, with a student cast augmented by a number of professional actors. This production also toured Israel, playing at a number of kibbutzim as a cultural exchange under the auspices of the Israeli government.

In 1980, Cherry took up an appointment as Chairman of the Theater Department and Professor of Theater at Temple University, Philadelphia. In 1985, he was appointed as associate director of the Boston Shakespeare Company.

Cherry died in Boston, Massachusetts  in March 1986, aged 53 of ischemic heart disease.

Legacy
In his memory, the highly regarded Wal Cherry Award is given annually for new Australian playwriting. Flinders University holds a biennial Wal Cherry lecture with the first lecture being given in 2006 by Dr Noni Hazlehurst AM (herself a graduate of Cherry's Flinders course) and the second in 2008 by Dr Robyn Archer AO.

Select Credits
Martine (1961)
Waters of the Moon (1961)

References

1932 births
1986 deaths
Australian theatre directors